Thorneyburn railway station served the village of Thorneyburn, Northumberland, England from 1861 to 1956 on the Border Counties Railway.

History 
The station opened on 1 February 1861 by the North British Railway. The station was situated on a gated lane, at a former level crossing and west of Lanehead. The station was omitted from the timetable of 1 September 1864 but reappeared in the timetable of 1 October 1864 but with trains on Tuesdays only. A map from 1866 shows that the station had a siding and a goods dock but in the 1898 edition of the map, the siding was gone and the 1904 Railway Clearing House Handbook showed that the station never handled goods traffic. A full weekday service commenced from 27 September 1937. The station closed completely on 15 October 1956. By 1974 the platform had gone and the level crossing gates were replaced shortly after.

References

External links 

Disused railway stations in Northumberland
Former North Eastern Railway (UK) stations
Railway stations in Great Britain opened in 1861
Railway stations in Great Britain closed in 1956
1861 establishments in England
1956 disestablishments in England